Marquis Amonte King (born December 12, 1992), better known by the stage names Jefe or Shy Glizzy (stylized as $hy Glizzy), is an American rapper from Southeast, Washington, D.C.

Background 
Shy Glizzy was born Marquis Amonte King on December 12, 1992, at Greater Southeast Community Hospital and grew up on 37th St., near Fort Dupont Park, in Southeast Washington, D.C. His father was shot and killed at 19 years old, before Shy's first birthday. He grew up in a household with his mother, grandmother, and his younger brother, . At age 14, he was arrested for petty larceny. At age 16, he was arrested for a robbery and spent 14 months in juvenile detention, where he also earned his GED.

He received his nickname "Shy" during early childhood. He is Muslim. As a teenager, he began reading the Quran, then the daily newspaper and stacks of biographies, before starting to write raps. He was initially "trying to write a book, but it ended up being a song." Shy has stated he did not listen to rap music growing up but rather go-go music, which he credits for helping to create his own unique sound.

Career

2011–2013 
In 2011, Shy Glizzy released his debut project, titled No Brain, in January. He released his second mixtape, Streets Hottest Youngin, on October 31.

On June 6, 2012, Shy released his third mixtape titled Law. He was also featured by Complex on its list of "10 New DMV Rappers To Watch Out For." The Washington City Papers Ramon Ramirez referred to it as "a well-connected tape [which] sometimes feels like it wants to be a major-label-debut", featuring guest appearances from Project Pat and Wale and production from Beat Billionaire, but described Shy as being "less polished, and more , while his hooks are repetitive and droning but also hungry and catchy."

On November 14, 2012, Shy released his fourth mixtape, Fly Money, an 11-track collaborative project with Jose Guapo. On December 12, he released his fifth mixtape, Fxck Rap, featuring a guest appearance from Trinidad James and production from Speaker Knockerz.

On March 16, 2013, Shy Glizzy was listed by Complex as one of "15 Unsigned Rappers Who Should Get a Deal After SXSW". On April 3, he announced his sixth mixtape, Law 2, which went on to be released on August 1, and included guest appearances from the likes of Migos, Yo Gotti, Starlito and Kevin Gates.

2014–2016 
On January 7, 2014, Shy Glizzy was listed by Fact as one of "10 Rappers to Watch in 2014". On January 20, he announced his seventh mixtape, Young Jefe, which went on to be released on February 17, and included guest appearances from the likes of Young Scooter, PeeWee Longway, Young Thug, Plies and Gudda Gudda. From that mixtape, the hit single "Awwsome" turned into the biggest song of his career and peaked at number 45 on the US Hot R&B/Hip-Hop Songs chart. It spawned a remix off the record that features A$AP Rocky and 2 Chainz that grabbed more than 750,000 streams on SoundCloud in the first week of its release.

On June 3, 2015, Shy Glizzy was selected as part of the XXL magazine Freshman Class list. That same day he released his ninth mixtape, Be Careful, a 16-track collaborative project with his Glizzy Gang collective which included members 30 Glizzy, Goo Glizzy and 3 Glizzy. On August 28, Shy announced his 10th mixtape, For Trappers Only, entirely produced by Zaytoven to be released on September 30. It included guest appearances from the likes of Boosie Badazz, Yo Gotti and Ty Dolla $ign.

On July 8, 2016, Shy Glizzy announced his 11th mixtape, Young Jefe 2, to be released on July 15.

In a December 2014 interview with The Fader, when asked about his thoughts on DMV rap, Shy responded "DMV still didn't become a thing. Nobody opened up a lane for DMV rap  I opened up my lane. I opened up Glizzy Gang lane, the southeast DC lane." However, in a January 2017 interview with The Fader, when asked about the state of DC's rap scene, Shy responded "I'm trying to open up that lane so more youngsters can come through. No one else ever opened that door for me  I got a whole culture——to put on for."

2017–present 
On January 6, 2017, Shy Glizzy released an EP, The World is Yours, under the stage name Jefe. HipHopDX's Aaron McKrell described it as "an energetic but hollow offering" but praised Shy Glizzy's delivery and "ability to manipulate vocal sonics." He rated the project 2.7 out of 5. Pitchfork's Sheldon Pearce stated that it "isn't King at the peak of his powers  Here, he mostly seems content to roll leisurely through verses" and showed "no sense of urgency." He rated the project 6.9 out of 10.

The single "Take Me Away" was released on September 29, dedicated to the memory of 30 Glizzy who was found dead a few weeks earlier. He released his 12th mixtape Quiet Storm on December 12, which he described as his "best body of work yet."

In 2018, Shy Glizzy released his debut studio album, Fully Loaded, on October 18, which included guest appearances from YoungBoy Never Broke Again, Lil Uzi Vert, Young Thug, Gunna, and Rick Ross. The album received positive reviews and peaked at number 35 on the US Billboard 200, selling 14,446 album-equivalent units in the first week. It was announced that Glizzy will embark on nationwide tour with Atlanta rapper Gunna on his Drip or Drown 2 tour.

In an April interview with HipHopDX's Daniela Evgenivna, Glizzy announced he would be releasing his second studio album titled Covered 'N Blood on April 19. He described the album as being more personal than the feature packed Fully Loaded stating "It's a really deep album. A lot of my music is like a diary. This one is about what I've been going through the last few months." On April 19, Covered n' Blood was released as Glizzy's second Billboard 200-charting record, peaking at 156. Shy ended 2019 with a second mixtape titled Aloha, inspired by and recorded on the island of Hawaii. On April 10, 2020, he released the single "Lonely Vibes". He released the song "Right Or Wrong" with Lil Uzi Vert on June 19.
On September 18, 2020, Shy Glizzy released his new project, Young Jefe 3. It was preceded by a video for "Forever Tre 7", featuring No Savage, a new signee to Glizzy's label, Glizzy Gang Records, an imprint under 300 Entertainment.

Discography

Studio albums

EPs

Mixtapes

Singles

As lead artist

As featured artist

Awards and nominations

References 

African-American male rappers
African-American Muslims
Southern hip hop musicians
Living people
Rappers from Washington, D.C.
1992 births
21st-century American rappers
21st-century American male musicians
21st-century African-American musicians